The Segunda División B promotion play-offs are a series of playoff matches contested by the teams finishing from 1st to 4th in each Segunda División B group. Sixteen teams play to take four promotion places.

Barakaldo CF has been in the Segunda División B promotion play-offs a record nine times: 1993-1994, 1997–2000, 2002–2003 and 2008, but never won promotion. Otherwise Racing de Ferrol, FC Barcelona B, Getafe CF and Real Murcia won promotion a record three times.

Teams from group 1 (usually from west) and group 4 (usually from south) won promotion twenty five times each. Group 3 (usually from east) has contributed with twenty three promotion teams and group 2 (usually from north) only twelve.

Format
All rounds are played over two legs.

Since 2008-09 season:
Champions of four Segunda División B groups play each other to take two promotion places. At same time, 2nd play 4th and 3rd play each other at first round.
Second round is played with six winners of first round and two losers champions.
Final round is played with four winners of second round to take the other two promotion places.

Promoted teams
Below is a list of promoted teams through the play-offs:

References

Promotion play-offs 2011 results

 
2
play-offs